The Norwegian continental shelf (abbreviated as NCS) is the continental shelf over which Norway exercises sovereign rights as defined by the United Nations Convention on the Law of the Sea.

The area of the shelf is four times the area of Norway mainland and constitutes about one-third of the Europe continental shelf. It is rich in petroleum and gas and it is the base of the petroleum economy of Norway.

References

External links
 Interactive Map over the Norwegian Continental Shelf, live information, facts, pictures and videos.
 Norwegian Government "Continental shelf – questions and answers"

Continental shelves of Europe
Landforms of Norway
Landforms of the North Sea
Geology of the North Sea
Petroleum in Norway